Ilya Viktorovich Yagodkin (born 17 July 1977) is a former Russian professional footballer.

Club career
He played 3 seasons in the Russian Football National League for PFC Spartak Nalchik.

References

External links
 

1977 births
Living people
Russian footballers
Association football defenders
PFC Spartak Nalchik players
FK Žalgiris players
FC Dynamo Saint Petersburg players
A Lyga players
Russian expatriate footballers
Expatriate footballers in Lithuania